(born Osaka, 16 July 1971) is a Japanese former rugby union player who played usually as hooker or as prop. He earned 16 caps without scoring in his international career.

Career
After his graduation from Doshisha University, Nakamichi joined Kobe Steel. He was part of the Kobe squad which dominated the Japanese rugby scene in the early 1990s. He debuted for the Japan's national team against Hong Kong in Tokyo, on 11 May 1996. He was called up by the then-national coach Seiji Hirao for the 1999 Rugby World Cup squad, playing two matches in the tournament. His last cap for Japan was against Tonga, in Tokyo, on 3 June 2000.

References

External links

Toshikazu Nakamichi Top League statistics

1971 births
Living people
Japanese rugby union players
Japan international rugby union players
Doshisha University alumni
Kobelco Kobe Steelers players
Rugby union hookers
Rugby union props